Cebine betaherpesvirus 1 (CbHV-1) is a species of virus in the genus Cytomegalovirus, subfamily Betaherpesvirinae, family Herpesviridae, and order Herpesvirales.

References

External links
 

Betaherpesvirinae